Kambja is a small borough in Tartu County, Estonia. It is the administrative centre of Kambja Parish.

Earlier there was located Vastse-Kambja manor (Neu-Kamby).

Kambja St. Martin's Church 
Kambja Church burned down several times, but was always rebuilt. The first mention of Kambja and the church at its present location dates to as early as 1330. After the first fire in 1558, it took 84 years to rebuild the church. Again was it destroyed in 1704 during the Great Northern War. Renovation were finished in 1721 and those walls are the basis for the present building. In 1874 an extension was built; there were ten thousand members in the parish around that time. In 1937 a new northern tower with staircases was built.

During World War II, on 19 August 1944, the church was bombed by the invading Russian troops. The new Soviet regime did not allow the church to be rebuilt and the congregation was forced to close.

The church remained in ruins until 1987, when the times started to change and on the initiative of Ivar Tedrema, the state farm director at that time, and with the help of school principal Madis Linnamägi, Toivo Traksmaa and many others, the renovation began.

The Lutheran congregation was re-established in 1994.

Gallery

See also 
 SK 10 Premium Tartu

References

External links 
 Kambja Parish 

Boroughs and small boroughs in Estonia
Kreis Dorpat